CD8 (cluster of differentiation 8) is a transmembrane glycoprotein that serves as a co-receptor for the T-cell receptor (TCR). Along with the TCR, the CD8 co-receptor plays a role in T cell signaling and aiding with cytotoxic T cell-antigen interactions.

Like the TCR, CD8 binds to a major histocompatibility complex (MHC) molecule, but is specific for the MHC class I protein.

There are two isoforms of the protein, alpha and beta, each encoded by a different gene. In humans, both genes are located on chromosome 2 in position 2p12.

Tissue distribution
The CD8 co-receptor is predominantly expressed on the surface of cytotoxic T cells, but can also be found on natural killer cells, cortical thymocytes, and dendritic cells. The CD8 molecule is a marker for cytotoxic T cell population. It is expressed in T cell lymphoblastic lymphoma and hypo-pigmented mycosis fungoides.

Structure
To function, CD8 forms a dimer, consisting of a pair of CD8 chains. The most common form of CD8 is composed of a CD8-α and CD8-β chain, both members of the immunoglobulin superfamily with an immunoglobulin variable (IgV)-like extracellular domain connected to the membrane by a thin stalk, and an intracellular tail. Less-common homodimers of the CD8-α chain are also expressed on some cells. The molecular weight of each CD8 chain is about 34 kDa. The structure of the CD8 molecule was determined by Leahy, D.J., Axel, R., and Hendrickson, W.A. by X-ray Diffraction at a 2.6A resolution.  The structure was determined to have an immunoglobulin-like beta-sandwich folding and 114 amino acid residues.  2% of the protein is wound into α-helices and 46% into β-sheets, with the remaining 52% of the molecules remaining in the loop portions.

Function
The extracellular IgV-like domain of CD8-α interacts with the α3 portion of the Class I MHC molecule. This affinity keeps the T cell receptor of the cytotoxic T cell and the target cell bound closely together during antigen-specific activation. Cytotoxic T cells with CD8 surface protein are called CD8+ T cells. The main recognition site is a flexible loop at the α3 domain of an MHC molecule.  This was discovered by doing mutational analyses.  The flexible α3 domain is located between residues 223 and 229 in the genome. In addition to aiding with cytotoxic T cell antigen interactions the CD8 co-receptor also plays a role in T cell signaling. The cytoplasmic tails of the CD8 co-receptor interact with Lck (lymphocyte-specific protein tyrosine kinase). Once the T cell receptor binds its specific antigen Lck phosphorylates the cytoplasmic CD3 and ζ-chains of the TCR complex which initiates a cascade of phosphorylation eventually leading to activation of transcription factors like NFAT, NF-κB, and AP-1 which affect the expression of certain genes.

References

External links
 T-cell Group - Cardiff University
 Mouse CD Antigen Chart
 Human CD Antigen Chart
 CD8 alpha - Marker for cytotoxic T lymphocytes 

Clusters of differentiation
Immunology
T cells